Bunga Fitriani Romadhini (born 11 January 1997) is an Indonesian badminton player affiliated with Mutiara Cardinal Bandung club.

Achievements

BWF International Challenge/Series 
Mixed doubles

  BWF International Challenge tournament
  BWF International Series tournament
  BWF Future Series tournament

Performance timeline

Individual competitions 
 Senior level

References

External links 
 

1997 births
Living people
Indonesian female badminton players
20th-century Indonesian women
21st-century Indonesian women